The Mike Walsh Show was an Australian variety daytime television series. Hosted by Mike Walsh, the show ran from 1973 to 1984 for 90 minutes each weekday afternoon.

History
The program was launched on the 0-10 Network and moved to the Nine Network in 1977.  By the 1980s, The Mike Walsh Show was syndicated to regional television stations around Australia.

Description
The program featured the latest in music, film, fashion, gossip and politics, and garnered around 5 million viewers locally each week, and presented live performances and interviews from celebrities both locally and internationally.
 
International guest celebrities included: Bette Midler, Jane Fonda, Lauren Bacall, John Cleese, Johnny Cash, The Village People, Big Bird, Helen Mirren and Jamie Lee Curtis

Awards 

The program won a total of 24 Logie awards including a Gold Logie for frequent guest star Jeanne Little in 1977, and host Mike Walsh in 1980. It also won the following awards:

Re-programming 
In February 1985, The Mike Walsh Show moved from its popular daytime timeslot to an evening timeslot, two nights a week.  The program in the prime time format was not successful, although The Mike Walsh Show'''s successor in the daytime slot, Midday with a very similar format to The Mike Walsh Show'', ran for fourteen years, garnering numerous awards.

References

External links

The Mike Walsh Show at the National Film and Sound Archive

Nine Network original programming
Network 10 original programming
Australian television talk shows
Australian variety television shows
1973 Australian television series debuts
1984 Australian television series endings
Black-and-white Australian television shows